Project Eden or The Eden Project may refer to:

Project Eden (video game), a 2001 action-adventure video game
Dirty Pair: Project Eden, a 1986 anime film
Eden Project, a visitor attraction in Cornwall, England
Eden (musician), formerly known as The Eden Project